Miguel Martinez (born 1978) is a Dominican-American politician and former New York City Council member from the 10th district in Upper Manhattan in New York City, United States. He was succeeded by Ydanis Rodriguez, who won election as a Democrat on November 3, 2009.

Biography
Martinez was born in the Dominican Republic and emigrated to the US. He received his bachelor's degree in Criminal Justice Planning and Administration at John Jay College of Criminal Justice in 1994.  As a student, he served as the 26th President of the Student Council in 1995.

Martinez was a fixture with the Northern Manhattan Democrats for Change political club, which he helped found and led with New York State Assembly member Adriano Espaillat.

Martinez represented the 10th district of the New York City Council, which includes parts of Washington Heights and Inwood sections of upper Manhattan. He served as a Council member for six years while chairing the Fire and Criminal Justice Services Committee.

Resignation and Criminal Conviction
He resigned abruptly from his city council seat on July 14, 2009 and pleaded guilty to three counts of conspiracy two days later. Martinez admitted to stealing $106,000 that was for children's art programs and low-income housing. Martinez was convicted on three felonies, and was sentenced to five years in prison.

References

American politicians of Dominican Republic descent
Dominican Republic emigrants to the United States
New York City Council members
Hispanic and Latino American New York City Council members
Living people
John Jay College of Criminal Justice alumni
Politicians convicted of mail and wire fraud
American money launderers
New York (state) politicians convicted of crimes
1978 births